Uroleucon pseudambrosiae is a species of aphid in the family Aphididae.

It feeds on wild lettuce (Lactuca spp.), pilewort (Erechtites hieracifolia), dandelion (Taraxacum), and Sonchus asper. It is found in North America. It can serve as a vector for Watermelon mosaic virus.

References

Articles created by Qbugbot
Insects described in 1963
Macrosiphini
Insect vectors of plant pathogens
Hemiptera of North America